The Kuwait International Rally (known originally as the Kuwait Rally, is an international rally racing event held on the coastline of Kuwait between the capital Kuwait City and the border with Saudi Arabia. It is the largest motor sport event held in Kuwait annually.

The rally, held on gravel roads and sand for the most part, has consistently been part of the Middle East Rally Championship but its history has been intermittent as Kuwait has been embroiled in armed conflict, first with the 1990 Iraqi invasion and the Gulf War and Iraq War which followed.

Emirati driver Mohammed bin Sulayem and Qatari driver Nasser Al-Attiyah are the most successful drivers in the events history, each taking four wins.

List of previous winners
List of winners sourced in part from:

External links
Official website

References

Motorsport in Kuwait
Rally competitions in Kuwait
Recurring sporting events established in 1984
Kuwait